Korea's drinking culture reveals much about its social structure, lifestyle, and traditions. The beverages themselves are also reflective of the country's geography, climate, and cultures.

Korea's interest in creating its own alcohol came about during the Koryo Dynasty (946–943), when exposure to foreign cultures and the introduction of distilled water created the basis and technique for distilling a unique alcohol.

Alcohol drinking in Korea helps create and form ties between family members and friends. Drinking is very present throughout traditional family rituals such as honoring ancestors. Aside from traditional holiday and family ritual drinking, alcohol consumption has modernized and become a huge part of socialization in Korean culture.

History of Korean drinking culture 
Korea has a long tradition of consuming alcohol to celebrate holidays and seasonal events, in which they honor ancestors and exchange goodwill with neighbors and friends. Some of the holidays included New Year, Rice planting day and Korea's Day of Thanks.

Farming 
Drinking alcohol is often correlated with a season's passing and its related farming activities. Once the harvest has ended farmers would spend their downtime brewing and fermenting alcohol as they looked forward to the spring.

Korean field workers often drank a glass of rice-wine (Takju) accompanied by a light breakfast snack (Saecham) before they left for the fields in the morning. Traditional Korean music (Nongak) would play while they worked.

Korean New Year 

Upon the new year Korean ancestors consumed Soju to drive out disease and bad spirits, the word 'Soju' meaning a welcoming spring. One type of Soju is called Dosoju, made with medicinal herbs and refined rice wine.

Alcohol consumption was also used to medicate both adults and children during illnesses. Because alcohol was held in such high regard, Korean ancestors took great pains to pass down drinking customs from generation to generation.

Daeboreum 

The 15th day of the New Year according to the lunar calendar is a traditional Korean holiday. Many attend moon-viewing events all over the country for the new year's first full moon. On that night, Koreans drink Daeboreium or "ear-quickening wine" in hopes of hearing good news quickly for the next year. While children do not drink the alcohol they are encouraged to place their lips to the glass, then pour the wine in a chimney to deter sickness and vaporization. Each region gave their own name to the beverage.

Dano 

The fifth day of the fifth month of the lunar calendar is called ‘Dano’. This is an important holiday and celebrates the transplanting of rice seedlings and the time of year when yin energy is weakest and yang energy is strongest.

The custom during ‘Dano’ was/is to hold a memorial service  for their ancestors and toast the day with a drink mixed with sweet flag called Changpoju. The properties in the drink were said to dispel evil spirits, providing escape from misfortune and promote health and longevity.

During this era most Koreans practiced Confucianism which prohibited women and certain other members of society from drinking alcohol or pouring it for someone else. However, in modern times anyone can partake in the customs.

Alcohol drinking etiquette 

Koreans have strict rules of etiquette in drinking alcoholic beverages. When receiving a glass from an elder, one must hold the glass with two hands (left palm at the bottom and hold the glass with the right hand) and bow the head slightly. When it is time to drink, the drinker must turn away from the elder, and cover the mouth and glass with their hands. The first drink must be finished in one shot. When the glass is empty, the drinker hands it back to the person who poured the drink for them and the drinker then pours them a shot. This starts a series of glass and bottle passes around the table.

By the middle of 1300s, manners and culture of drinking came into Korea. There are many manners about drinking alcohol in Korea. Among them is a typical manner of drinking culture called Hyangeumjurye(향음주례)'. It was an event that saw many classical and Confucian scholars gather and drink, learning drinking manners. It also meant that people had to respect benevolent persons and support old men. It was held every October.

Within 'Hyanguemjurye', the most important thing about Korea drinking culture is manners. Koreans believed drinking etiquette is important. When people become of age to drink alcohol, they are taught how to drink with other people by elders, because Korean ancestors thought that pouring and receiving drinks was important over the bowl.

Pouring drinks 

In Korea, it is traditional that when a person gives an alcoholic drink to another adult, the person has to offer the drink respectfully with two hands. When pouring a drink, the bottle should be held with the right hand, and the wrist of your right hand held lightly with the left hand. It is customary to wait until the glass is empty to pour another.

Receiving drinks 
There is also a tradition for receiving drinks. When receiving drinks, the same etiquette applies when pouring drinks. When elders give alcohol to a younger person, the younger person should receive the drink politely and with gratitude by saying "thank you". The next step is to hit the bottle, and then put it down. This pleases the elders. Also, when drinking beer, it is proper for the younger drinker to turn their head, so as to not directly face the elders when drinking.

Modern Korean drinking culture 

As society developed, the drinking culture started to change. In the past, people drank on specific days like New Year's, but presently alcohol can be consumed regardless of the occasion. The goal of drinking parties is to promote good fellowship and open one's heart to talking. Some other aspects are beginning to adapt to modern ways as well; Koreans are changing to enjoy drinking all kinds of alcohol. They also like to make special cocktails like "bomb drink" or "poktanju". A "bomb drink" is a mixed drink similar to the American boilermaker—a whiskey shot sunk into a glass of beer. In Korea, many people like "poktanju". Examples are soju and (maekju) beer = Somaek, foreign liquors and beers, and soju, beer and coke (kojingamlae). Poktanju makes people inebriated fairly quickly; nevertheless, people enjoy drinking it and drink it bottoms up. There are many Poktanju, with many new ones becoming famous, including 'red eye' and 'meakkiss', and commonly mix alcohol with other liquids such as milk, tomato juice, coke and coffee.

Consumption frequency 
According to a 2018 WHO report, citizens of the Republic of Korea drink 16L of alcohol per capita per year.  The “bottoms-up” approach to drinking translates to drinking one-shot at a time rather than drinking a little sip each time. Whether drinking casually with a guest or binge drinking, statistics gathered on Koreans have categorized drinking occasions in to five different types: going out with friends (44.2%), going out with colleagues (34.2%), drinking at home or friend’s home (29.3%), drinking at home alone, and drinking with meals at home (27.5%). Regardless of the setting, drinking has become a major part of modern Korean socialization. A large majority of Korean people have regarded drinking as a necessary element of social life. Whether it’s during a time of joy, happiness, or stress, Koreans often drink until they are drunk. According to official Korean statistics in 2013, Koreans consume more alcohol than rice, the staple food.

Drinking in the workplace 
Drinking plays an important role in workplace socialization in Korean culture. One of the most important forms of socialization in Korean organizations is hoesik or "dining together". Hoesik and "bottoms-up sessions" are time for employees to gather and encourage each other to consume alcohol. These drinking sessions help promote and influence idea sharing and building of social networks. It has been reported that a typical job application form will even ask applicants to reveal whether or not they drink alcohol and if so, how much do they consume. Also part of the application process is the so-called "alcohol interview", where the applicant is given several shots of alcohol to consume. This will determine their alcohol tolerance and will see if they are someone who will work well with the organization.

Aside from the enjoyment and high spirits that Koreans desire from partaking in frequent drinking, many employees consume alcohol to help alleviate high amounts of stress. The culture of binge drinking, which is defined as having six to seven drinks on one occasion, is closely associated with relieving elevated levels of stress. Reports have shown that more than 50% of Koreans who drink, do so to help release their stress.

Employee well-being 
Although drinking culture in Korea has developed a “one shot at time” and “bottoms-up” approach, the Korean Government has started a campaign to intervene and decrease heavy drinking. According to the campaign, people were urged to not mix their drinks, refrain from bar-hopping, and to return to their homes by 9 pm. Hoesik may be one of the main organization socialization processes in Korea, but it also has negative impacts on employee welfare, productivity, and work environment. Frequent binge drinking may result in low work productivity due to tardiness, hangovers, or pure work avoidance. To help encourage healthier drinking habits, the Ministry of Food and Drug Safety had created a website called sullae jabgi, which provides Koreans information on how to enjoy alcohol without threatening one’s well-being.

Alcohol-related disease 

Drinking is the second leading cause of a decline in health for Koreans. The World Health Organization has identified drinking as a major factor affecting health-related quality of life. According to statistics, the leading cause of death in Korea was cancer. Liver cancer and other liver disease were among the top 10 causes of death in Korea. An increasing number of Koreans are also being diagnosed with osteonecrosis, with the leading cause being excessive alcohol consumption.

See also 
Chimaek
Korean alcoholic beverages
Hangover drinks in South Korea

References 

Alcohol in South Korea
Korea
Korean cuisine
Korean culture